Purpuraturris tanyspira is a species of sea snail, a marine gastropod mollusk in the family Turridae, the turrids.

Description

Distribution
This marine species occurs off Mozambique and Madagascar.

References

 Kilburn R.N. (1975). Taxonomic notes on South African marine Mollusca (5): including descriptions of new taxa of Rissoidae, Cerithiidae, Tonnidae, Cassididae, Buccinidae, Fasciolariidae, Turbinellidae, Turridae, Architectonicidae, Epitoniidae, Limidae and Thraciidae.. Annals of the Natal Museum 22(2):577–622, figs. 1–25
 Bozzetti L. (2006) Turris ankaramanyensis (Gastropoda: Hypsogastropoda: Turridae) nuova specie dal Madagascar Meridionale. Malacologia Mostra Mondiale 52: 8–9.

External links
 Chase, K., Watkins, M., Safavi-Hemami, H. & Olivera, B. M. (2022). Integrating venom peptide libraries into a phylogenetic and broader biological framework. Frontiers in Molecular Biosciences. 9: 784419.

tanyspira
Gastropods described in 1975